Russell Market is a shopping market in Bangalore, built in 1927 by the British and inaugurated in 1933 by Ismail Sait. It is named of the then Municipal commissioner T. B. Russell.

Fire
On 26 February 2012, a fire started in the market, in the early hours of Saturday, gutting 123 shops and causing loss of Rs89.2 lakh to the shop owners. Initial investigations reveal that the fire broke out because of short-circuit.

References

Shopping malls in Bangalore
1933 establishments in India
Shopping malls established in 1933
20th-century architecture in India